The 1962 Dallas Cowboys season was their third in the league. The team finished with a record of 5 wins, 8 losses, and 1 tie, placing them 5th in the NFL's Eastern Conference.

Offseason
The Cowboys traded away their first-round draft choice (fourth overall) in 1962 NFL Draft to the Cleveland Browns. With their first selection the Cowboys selected quarterback Sonny Gibbs from Texas Christian University in the second round (eighteenth overall). Other notable selections in the draft included defensive end George Andrie from Marquette University in the sixth round and Harold Hays from Southern Mississippi in the fourteenth round.

The team acquired several veterans prior to the 1962 season. Sam Baker, formerly of the Browns, was acquired to bring stability to the kicker position. The team traded for offensive tackle Monte Clark from the San Francisco 49ers and acquired Dale Memmelaar, an offensive lineman formerly of the St. Louis Cardinals. Jerry Norton, an eight-year veteran who had played for the Cardinals and the Philadelphia Eagles, was acquired to help out in the secondary. Dick Nolan, who had played defensive back for the New York Giants when Cowboys head coach Tom Landry was the defensive coach there, was hired as an assistant coach on the defensive side of the ball, but ended up actually playing safety for most of the season, in addition to coaching. Lee Folkins, who spent his rookie season with the Green Bay Packers, was the Cowboys starting tight end for most of the year.

Notable rookie free agents the Cowboys signed prior to the season included Pettis Norman, from Johnson C. Smith University, Mike Gaechter, a track and field athlete as well as a football player, from the University of Oregon, and Cornell Green, a basketball player from Utah State University.

14 rookies would end up making the team (7 draft choices, 4 undrafted free agents, 2 acquired by trade and one claimed off waivers):
 Donnie Davis, wide receiver
 George Andrie, defensive end
 Guy Reese, defensive tackle
 Amos Bullocks, running back
 Lynn Hoyem, offensive guard
 Don Talbert, offensive tackle
 Dave Edwards, Linebacker
 Pettis Norman, tight end
 Joe Isbell, offensive guard
 Cornell Green, cornerback
 Mike Gaechter, a safety
 John Meyers, defensive tackle
 Clyde Brock, offensive tackle
 John Cornett, offensive tackle

Schedule

Conference opponents are in bold text

Season recap
The Cowboys got off to a frustrating start to the 1962 season, as the team was unable to capitalize on opportunities to win their first two games, both played at home. Head coach Tom Landry decided to alternate between quarterbacks Eddie LeBaron and Don Meredith on every play, and the system proved its worth from the start, as the Cowboys offense rolled up 35 points and 483 yards against the Washington Redskins. Flanker Frank Clarke caught 10 passes for 241 yards and scored 3 touchdowns in the game, but kicker Sam Baker missed a 35-yard field goal with 13 seconds left and the Cowboys had to settle for a 35–35 tie. The next week against the Pittsburgh Steelers the team saw a 99-yard touchdown pass from LeBaron to Clarke be erased due to a holding call in the end zone, which not only wiped out the touchdown but also awarded a safety to the Steelers, giving them the 2 points which turned out to be the difference in a 30–28 loss for the Cowboys. The team rebounded the next week in Los Angeles against the Rams with a 27–17 victory, highlighted by LeBaron's 85-yard touchdown pass to Amos Marsh, but lost a defensive struggle in Cleveland the next week to the Browns 19–10.

The Cowboys, leading the NFL in offense after the first four weeks, went on to score a combined 83 points in their next two games, victories over the Philadelphia Eagles and the Steelers. The Cowboys were unable to maintain momentum, losing to the struggling St. Louis Cardinals 28–24 in a sloppily played game, despite Don Perkins rushing for 137 yards. The following week, the Cowboys may have played their most complete game of the season against the surprising Redskins, beating them in Washington 38–10, with the Cowboys' usually inconsistent defense holding the Redskins to 293 yards and just 10 points, while the offense provided their usual assortment of big plays.

The Cowboys faced their biggest test of the season the following week against the Eastern Conference-leading New York Giants in front of a record crowd at home, but the Giants won in a rout, 41–10. Both Eddie LeBaron and Frank Clarke were injured in the game, limiting the Cowboys offense over the next few weeks, and leading to a repeat of the team's late-season tailspin of 1961. The Cowboys would go on to lose four of the last five games of the season, and while Meredith's inexperience would prove costly at times, it was the defense that was the main culprit, allowing 446 yards or more over five of the last six games. The lone bright spot of the late season was a 45–21 victory over the Browns in the team's home finale. Meredith enjoyed his finest day as a professional, throwing two touchdown passes in the first half, and the maligned defense held Browns fullback Jim Brown to just 13 yards.

The Cowboys offense was among the league's best in 1962, finishing second in both yards gained and points scored. The passing offense finished seventh, and quarterbacks Eddie LeBaron and Don Meredith combined for 31 touchdown passes, second in the league. LeBaron earned a trip to the Pro Bowl for his stellar season, his 8.7 yards per pass attempt ranking second overall among quarterbacks. Frank Clarke emerged as one of the league's top receivers, catching 47 passes for 1043 yards and a league best 14 touchdown receptions, while veteran Billy Howton led the team in receptions with 49. The rushing game finished second overall with Don Perkins and Amos Marsh combining for 1747 of the Cowboys 2040 rushing yards. Perkins earned all-pro recognition for his season.

The defense struggled for much of the season, finishing 13th in both yards allowed and points allowed, as the relatively inexperienced players on defense struggled with injuries and the intricacies of Tom Landry's defense. The team showed improvement from the previous two seasons against the run however, finishing fourth overall and allowing only 3.9 yards per carry. Against the pass the defense finished last in passing yards allowed, and allowed a league high 16.8 yards per completion. The pass rush was too often a non-factor, and the defense didn't force as many turnovers as the previous season. Despite these struggles, the Cowboys did get some strong performances from individual performers such as second-year defensive lineman Bob Lilly, who was named to his first pro bowl, and cornerback Don Bishop, who finished with six interceptions. Middle linebacker Jerry Tubbs also earned pro bowl recognition.

Veteran Sam Baker improved the team's kicking game from the previous season, averaging 45.4 yards per punt, and converting 14 field goals out of 27 attempts. Amos Marsh had a solid season returning kickoffs, averaging 25.0 yards per kick return, and returning a kickoff for a score in a victory against the Eagles. The team struggled covering kickoff returns, allowing 25.5 yards per kick return, and finding a reliable punt returner was becoming an annual problem.

NFL Draft

Roster

Standings

See also
1962 NFL season
1962 NFL Draft

Publications
The Football Encyclopedia 
Total Football 
Cowboys Have Always Been My Heroes

References

External links
 1962 Dallas Cowboys
 Pro Football Hall of Fame
 Dallas Cowboys Official Site

Dallas Cowboys seasons
Dallas Cowboys
Dallas Cowboys